Reasons for opposition to pornography include religious objections and feminist concerns (for specific sectors of feminism), as well as alleged harmful effects, such as pornography addiction. Pornography addiction is not a condition recognized by the DSM-5, or the ICD-11. Anti-pornography movements have allied disparate social activists in opposition to pornography, from social conservatives to harm reduction advocates. The definition of "pornography" varies between countries and movements, and many make distinctions between pornography, which they oppose, and erotica, which they consider acceptable. Sometimes opposition will deem certain forms of pornography more or less harmful, while others draw no such distinctions.

A 2018 Gallup survey reported that 43% of U.S. adults believe that pornography is "morally acceptable", a 7% increase from 2017. From 1975 to 2012, the gender gap in pornography opposition has widened, with women remaining more opposed to pornography than men, and men's opposition has declined faster. Some extremist Christian and far-right groups have issued death threats towards porn managers and sex workers.

Religious views

Most world religions have positions in opposition to pornography from a variety of rationales, including concerns about modesty, human dignity, chastity and other virtues. There are numerous verses in the Bible which are cited as condemning pornography or adultery, notably for Christians, Matthew 5:28 in the Sermon on the Mount which states "that anyone who looks at a woman lustfully has already committed adultery with her in his heart."

The Catechism of the Catholic Church explicitly condemns pornography because it "offends against chastity" and "does grave injury to the dignity of its participants" since "each one becomes an object of base pleasure and illicit profit for others".

Islam also forbids adultery, and various verses of the Quran have been cited as condemning pornography, including Quran 24:31 which tells men to "restrain their eyes" from looking sexually at women.

Feminist views

Some feminists are opposed to pornography, arguing that it is an industry which exploits women and is complicit in violence against women, both in its production (where they present evidence that abuse and exploitation of women performing in pornography is rampant) and in its consumption (where pornography eroticizes the domination, humiliation, and coercion of women, and reinforces sexual and cultural attitudes that are complicit in rape and sexual harassment). They charge that pornography contributes to the male-centered objectification of women and thus to sexism. Andrea Dworkin was a feminist famously opposed to the pornography industry, and proposed the Antipornography Civil Rights Ordinance in several American cities in the 1980s. In modern day, feminist Gail Dines founded Culture Reframed, which responds to the growing pornography industry by providing education and support for healthy child and youth development.

However, many other feminists are opposed to censorship, and have argued against the introduction of anti-porn legislation in the United States, among them Betty Friedan, Kate Millett, Karen DeCrow, Wendy Kaminer and Jamaica Kincaid. Some sex-positive feminists actively support pornography that depicts female sexuality in a positive way, without objectifying or demeaning women, whereas some other feminists don't see any problem with the industry in its current state, given the subjective nature of perceiving humiliation or aggressiveness in a consensual context as something demeaning or negative.

Conservative views
Religious conservatives commonly oppose pornography, along with a subset of feminists, though their reasoning may differ. Many religious conservatives view pornography as a threat to children. Some conservative Catholics and Protestants oppose pornography because they believe that it encourages non-procreative sex, encourages abortion, and can be connected to the rise of sexually transmitted diseases.

Concerned Women For America (CWA) is a conservative organization that opposes same-sex marriage and abortion. When discussing violence against women, the CWA often uses pornography to illustrate their points. The CWA asserts that pornography is a major reason why men inflict harm on women. The CWA argues that pornography convinces men to disrespect their wives and neglect their marriages, thereby threatening the sanctity of traditional marriage. Unlike other issues CWA has tackled, they are less forcefully anti-feminist when it comes to the topic of pornography, as many of their points surrounding why pornography is distasteful parallels those of anti-pornography feminists.

Harm-based views

Dolf Zillmann argued in the 1986 publication "Effects of Prolonged Consumption of Pornography" that extensive viewing of pornographic material produces many unfavorable political effects, including a decreased respect for long-term monogamous relationships, and an attenuated desire for procreation. He describes the theoretical basis of these experimental findings:The values expressed in pornography clash so obviously with the family concept, and they potentially undermine the traditional values that favor marriage, family, and children... Pornographic scripts dwell on sexual engagements of parties who have just met, who are in no way attached or committed to each other, and who will part shortly, never to meet again... Sexual gratification in pornography is not a function of emotional attachment, of kindness, of caring, and especially not of continuance of the relationship, as such continuance would translate into responsibilities, curtailments, and costs...

A study by Zillman in 1982 also indicated that prolonged exposure to pornography desensitized both men and women toward victims of sexual violence. After being shown pornographic movies, test subjects were asked to judge an appropriate punishment for a rapist. The test subjects recommended incarceration terms that were significantly more lenient than those recommended by control subjects who had not watched pornography.

Some researchers like Zillman believe that pornography causes unequivocal harm to society by increasing rates of sexual assault. Other researchers believe that there is a correlation between pornography and a decrease of sex crimes.

The appropriation of the sexually explicit in American culture is part of what has been called "the pornification of America".

Rape culture is often discussed when it comes to pornography, and is defined by society victim-blaming women because of their rape. It is known as society making rape less substantial. Some of the most searched titles on pornography websites is rape scenes.

In 2016, model and actress Pamela Anderson and Orthodox Rabbi Shmuley Boteach co-authored a viral Wall Street Journal opinion piece, in which they called online pornography a "public hazard of unprecedented seriousness." The two called for a "sensual revolution" to replace "pornography with eroticism, the alloying of sex with love, of physicality with personality, of the body’s mechanics with imagination, of orgasmic release with binding relationships." They later gave a joint lecture at Oxford University to over 1,000 people. The two also wrote a book together, Lust for Love (2018), about how meaningful, passionate sex has been declining, and calling for a new sensual revolution that emphasizes partners connecting in the bedroom.

Some studies suggest that children and youths are more susceptible to the neurological effects of pornography consumption than adults, however this lacks direct empirical evidence. This can be attributed to considerable ethical problems with performing such research. Since those problems are a huge obstacle, it is likely that such research will not be allowed, thus possibly it could never be known. Rory Reid (UCLA) declared "Universities don't want their name on the front page of a newspaper for an unethical study exposing minors to porn."

While the World Health Organization's ICD-11 (2022) has recognized compulsive sexual behaviour disorder (CSBD) as an "impulsive control disorder", CSBD is not an addiction, and the American Psychiatric Association's DSM-5 (2013) and the DSM-5-TR (2022) do not classify compulsive pornography consumption as a mental disorder or a behavioral addiction. According to Emily F. Rothman, "The professional public health community is not behind the recent push to declare pornography a public health crisis."

See also

Anti-pornography movement in the United Kingdom
Anti-pornography movement in the United States
Criticism of Wikipedia#Sexual content
Effects of pornography
Pornography addiction
Pornography by region
Religious views on pornography
Right to pornography
Women Against Pornography
Women Against Violence in Pornography and Media

References

Further reading

Anti-pornography advocacy
Susan Brownmiller (1999). In Our Time: Memoir of a Revolution. The Dial Press. .
Victor Cline (1994). Pornography effects: Empirical and clinical evidence. 
Nikki Craft, long-time political, anti-pornography activist and prolific writer on feminist subjects
Andrea Dworkin (1979). Pornography: Men Possessing Women. .
Susan Griffin. Pornography and Silence: Culture's Revenge Against Nature. New York: Harper, 1981.
Craig Gross, founder of XXXchurch.com, a non-profit Christian organization that educates on the dangers of pornography use and involvement
Robert Jensen (2007). Getting Off: Pornography and the End of Masculinity. Cambridge, MA: South End Press. .
Gail Dines/Robert Jensen/Ann Russo (1998). Pornography: The Production and Consumption of Inequality. Routledge. .
Susanne Kapeller (1986). The Pornography of Representation. Polity Press, Cambridge, UK .
Michael Kimmel (1991). Men Confront Pornography. New York: Meridian — Random House. . (a variety of essays that try to assess ways that pornography may take influence or harm men)
Shelley Lubben, former porn performer and self-described "porn missionary" who counsels active porn performers on how to escape the industry (2010). Truth Behind the Fantasy of Porn: The Greatest Illusion on Earth. CreateSpace. .
Catharine MacKinnon (1985). Pornography, Civil Rights, and Speech. 20 Harv. C.R.-C.L. L. Rev. 1 (arguing that pornography is one of the mechanisms of power used to maintain gender inequality)
Donny Pauling, former pornographic producer who currently speaks about the unseen side of porn that is damaging to the women involved; frequently worked with Craig Gross of XXXChurch, until pleading to a six-year underage sex sentencing
Christine Stark and Rebecca Whisnant (2004).

Criticism of anti-pornography
Susie Bright. "Susie Sexpert's Lesbian Sex World and Susie Bright's Sexual Reality: A Virtual Sex World Reader", San Francisco, CA: Cleis Press, 1990 and 1992. Challenges any easy equation between feminism and anti-pornography positions.
Betty Dodson. "Feminism and Free speech: Pornography." Feminists for Free Expression 1993. 8 May 2002.
Kate Ellis. Caught Looking: Feminism, Pornography, and Censorship. New York: Caught Looking Incorporated, 1986.
Matthew Gever. "Pornography Helps Women, Society", UCLA Bruin, 1998-12-03.
Michele Gregory. "Pro-Sex Feminism: Redefining Pornography (or, a study in alliteration: the pro pornography position paper) "
Gayle Rubin, "Dangerous, Misguided, and Wrong: An Analysis of Anti-Pornograph Politics." In "Bad Girl and Dirty Pictures," ed. Carol Assuster (1993). 
Andrea Juno and V. Vale. Angry Women, Re/Search # 12. San Francisco, CA: Re/Search Publications, 1991. Performance artists and literary theorists who challenge Dworkin and MacKinnon's claim to speak on behalf of all women.
"A Feminist Overview of Pornography, Ending in a Defense Thereof"
"A Feminist Defense of pornography"
Ley, David, Prause, Nicole, & Finn, Peter. (2014). The Emperor Has No Clothes: A review of the "Pornography Addiction" model. Current Sexual Health Reports, manuscript in press.
Annalee Newitz. "Obscene Feminists: Why Women Are Leading the Battle Against Censorship." San Francisco Bay Guardian Online 8 May 2002. 9 May 2002
Nadine Strossen:
"Defending Pornography: Free Speech, Sex and the Fight for Women's Rights"
"Nadine Strossen: Pornography Must Be Tolerated"
Scott Tucker. "Gender, Fucking, and Utopia: An Essay in Response to John Stoltenberg's Refusing to Be a Man." in Social Text 27 (1991): 3-34. Critique of Stoltenberg and Dworkin's positions on pornography and power.
Carole Vance, Editor. "Pleasure and Danger: Exploring Female Sexuality". Boston: Routledge, 1984. Collection of papers from 1982 conference; visible and divisive split between anti-pornography activists and lesbian S&M theorists.

Notes

 
Censorship of pornography
Social conservatism